Vishnyovy is a rural locality (a settlement) in Tverdokhlebovskoye Rural Settlement, Bogucharsky District, Voronezh Oblast, Russia. The population was 330 as of 2010. There are 7 streets.

Geography 
Vishnyovy is located 230 km south of Voronezh, 20 km northwest of Boguchar (the district's administrative centre) by road. Tverdokhlebovka is the nearest rural locality.

References 

Rural localities in Bogucharsky District